The Compaq Professional Workstation was a family of workstations produced by Compaq. Introduced in late October 1996, the first entry in the family featured single or dual Pentium Pro processors. Later entries featured Pentium IIs and IIIs; the XP1000 was the only non-x86 based entry, featuring a DEC Alpha processor. Compaq aimed the Professional Workstation at computer-aided design users, software programmers, multimedia designers and financial workers. While workers of those fields primarily ran Unix-based operating systems on workstations at the time, the Compaq Professional Workstation came preinstalled with Windows NT 4.0 Workstation (later Windows 2000 Professional). The line was discontinued in 2002.

Models

References

Computer-related introductions in 1996
Professional Workstation
Computer workstations
Professional Workstation